Jean Rigaux (10 February 1909 – 10 December 1991) was a French songwriter and actor.

Selected filmography
 The Lost Woman (1942)
 Madly in Love (1943)

References

External links
Jean Rigaux on IMDb

1909 births
1991 deaths
Male actors from Paris
French songwriters
Male songwriters
20th-century French male actors